Joan Jian-Jian Ren is a Chinese-American statistician whose research concerns survival analysis and longitudinal data analysis for biomedical applications. She is a professor of mathematics at the University of Maryland, College Park.

Education and career
Ren grew up in Beijing, and majored in mathematics at Peking University, graduating in 1982. After studying for a master's degree at the University of Montana, she completed a Ph.D. in 1990 at the University of North Carolina at Chapel Hill. Her dissertation, On Hadamard Differentiability and M-Estimation in Linear Models, was supervised by Pranab K. Sen.

After earning her Ph.D., Ren was on the faculty of the mathematics department at the University of Nebraska–Lincoln from 1990 to 1997. She held positions at Tulane University and the University of Central Florida before moving to the University of Maryland in 2011.

Recognition
Ren was named to the 2022 class of Fellows of the Institute of Mathematical Statistics, for "innovative and significant contributions to statistical methodology, especially in nonparametric likelihood inference, survival analysis and resampling methods, and for long-lasting and dedicated professional service".

References

External links
Home page

Year of birth missing (living people)
Living people
American statisticians
American women statisticians
Chinese statisticians
Chinese women scientists
Peking University alumni
University of Montana alumni
University of North Carolina at Chapel Hill alumni
University of Nebraska–Lincoln faculty
Tulane University faculty
University of Central Florida faculty
University of Maryland, College Park faculty
Fellows of the Institute of Mathematical Statistics